Soyasapogenol B glucuronide galactosyltransferase (UDP-galactose:SBMG-galactosyltransferase, UGT73P2, GmSGT2 (gene), UDP-galactose:soyasapogenol B 3-O-glucuronide beta-D-galactosyltransferase) is an enzyme with systematic name UDP-alpha-D-galactose:soyasapogenol B 3-O-glucuronide beta-D-galactosyltransferase. This enzyme catalyses the following chemical reaction

 UDP-alpha-D-galactose + soyasapogenol B 3-O-beta-D-glucuronide  UDP + soyasaponin III

This enzyme takes part of the biosynthetic pathway for soyasaponins.

References

External links 

EC 2.4.1